Anton Konstantinovich Zabolotny (born 13 June 1991) is a Russian professional football player. He plays as a striker for CSKA Moscow.

Club career
On 12 December 2017, he signed a 3.5-year contract with Zenit St. Petersburg.

Before the 2019–20 season, he was demoted to the PFL squad Zenit-2.

On 8 August 2019, he moved to PFC Sochi. On 31 May 2021, he returned to CSKA Moscow on a 3-year contract.

Career statistics

Honours
Zenit Saint Petersburg
Russian Premier League: 2018–19

International career
He made his debut for Russia national football team on 7 October 2017 in a friendly game against South Korea.

On 11 May 2018, he was included in Russia's extended 2018 FIFA World Cup squad as a back-up. He was not included in the finalized World Cup squad.

On 11 May 2021, he was included in the preliminary extended 30-man squad for UEFA Euro 2020. On 2 June 2021, he was included in the final squad. He did not appear in any games as Russia was eliminated at group stage.

International goals
 (Russia score listed first, score column indicates score after each Zabolotny goal)

References

External links
 

1991 births
People from Aizpute
Living people
Russian footballers
Association football forwards
Russia youth international footballers
Russia under-21 international footballers
Russia international footballers
PFC CSKA Moscow players
FC Volgar Astrakhan players
FC Ural Yekaterinburg players
FC Dynamo Bryansk players
FC Ufa players
FC Fakel Voronezh players
FC Tosno players
FC Zenit Saint Petersburg players
FC Zenit-2 Saint Petersburg players
PFC Sochi players
Russian Premier League players
Russian First League players
Russian Second League players
UEFA Euro 2020 players
Latvian people of Russian descent